The United Democratic Forces of Belarus is a coalition of political parties that oppose the presidency of Alexander Lukashenko, who has been in power since 1994. It was the main opposition group during the 2006 presidential election and chose Alexander Milinkevich as their candidate.

Official Belarusian statistics reported Milinevich gained 6% of the vote, however Belarusian opposition and critics from Western countries have not accepted the official results as legitimate and believe this is an example of election fraudulence. Belarusian authorities have denied all accusations of election fraud.

Currently the United Civic Party and Belarusian Left Party "A Just World" make up the majority of the coalition. The BPF Party keeps its membership in the coalition, however concentrates more on the newly created coalition of conservative parties, the Belarusian Independence Bloc.

Members 
 Belarusian Left Party "A Just World"
 United Civic Party of Belarus
 Belarusian Social Democratic Party (Assembly)
 Belarusian Labour Party
 BPF Party
 Movement for Freedom

References

External links 
 

2006 establishments in Belarus
Belarusian opposition
Liberal parties in Belarus
Political parties established in 2006
Political party alliances in Belarus
Pro-European political parties in Belarus